Karoline Amaral (born June 29, 1984) is a Brazilian model. She has been the face of brands such as Boss, Emporio Armani, Erreuno, Iceberg, Roberta Scarpa and did more than 100 shows in various fashion weeks.

Her model agencies are: Modelwerk, Why Not Model Agency, Nass Model Mgmt, Premier.

External links 

Living people
1984 births
Brazilian female models
People from Brasília